Coenogonium implexum is a yellow-green byssoid lichen with light orange apothecia found in Australia. It is in the family Coenogoniaceae, and was first described by William Nylander in 1862.

References

Gyalectales
Lichen species
Lichens of Australia
Taxa named by William Nylander (botanist)
Lichens described in 1862